Tan-y-Bwlch (Welsh for Under the pass/gap) lies in the Snowdonia National Park in North Wales and is primarily known as the location of Tan-y-Bwlch railway station, on the narrow gauge Ffestiniog Railway.

Llyn Mair, an artificially created lake, is a popular picnic place, and there is a walk around it.

Nearby is Plas Tan-y-Bwlch, which today is the Snowdonia National Park environmental studies centre, administered by the National Park Authority.

References

Villages in Gwynedd
Villages in Snowdonia
Maentwrog